The 1936 All-Ireland Minor Football Championship was the eighth staging of the All-Ireland Minor Football Championship, the Gaelic Athletic Association's premier inter-county Gaelic football tournament for boys under the age of 18.

Mayo entered the championship as defending champions.

On 27 September 1936, Louth won the championship following a 5-1 to 1-8 defeat of Kerry in the All-Ireland final. This was their first All-Ireland title.

The victorious Louth team included several players from neighbouring counties who were boarding pupils at Saint Mary's College of Dundalk, then the dominant side in Louth minor football. One of the boarders was captain Larry "Lal" McEntee from Nobber, County Meath, whose nephew Dr. Gerry McEntee would win the All-Ireland Senior Football Championship in both 1987 and 1988 with the  Meath senior footballers.

Results

Connacht Minor Football Championship

Munster Minor Football Championship

Leinster Minor Football Championship

Ulster Minor Football Championship

All-Ireland Minor Football Championship

Semi-Finals

Final (Croke Park, Dublin)

{| width=100% style="font-size: 100%"
|

References

1936
All-Ireland Minor Football Championship